Cheshmeh Zangi may refer to:
 Cheshmeh Zangi, Kermanshah
 Cheshmeh Zangi, South Khorasan